Jordan Langs (born  1988/89) is an American college football coach and former player. He served as the head football coach at Indiana Wesleyan University from the program inceiption in 2016 to December 2022. In 2018, the Indiana Wesleyan Wildcats began their inaugural season of play.

Early life and playing career
Langs is a native of Climax, Michigan, where he graduated from Climax-Scotts High School in 2008.  He was a three-year varsity starter and a two-time all-state selection.

After high school, Langs continued his football career at Wheaton College, in Wheaton, Illinois, as a three-year starter for the Wheaton Thunder football team.  His playing career spanned the years 2008 to 2011.  Langs graduated in 2012 with a degree in history and social science.

Coaching career

Wheaton
After graduating from Wheaton College, Langs returned to his alma mater in 2012 to serve two seasons as defensive backs coach.  In 2014, Langs was named the team's defensive coordinator.  Over the next three years, Langs' defenses were among the best in all of NCAA Division III football, compiling an overall record of 33–4 (.892), winning two conference titles.

Indiana Wesleyan
In 2016, Langs became the first head football coach at Indiana Wesleyan University. After two years of preparation, the Wildcats began play in the 2018 season. The Wildcats dominated on both offense and defense and returned home with a 61–6 victory.

Family
Langs and his wife, Lindsay, have three children: Levi, Grayson, and Makayla.

Head coaching record

References

1989 births
Living people
American football defensive backs
American football linebackers
Indiana Wesleyan Wildcats football coaches
Wheaton Thunder football coaches
Wheaton Thunder football players
People from Kalamazoo County, Michigan
Coaches of American football from Michigan
Players of American football from Michigan